Wild onion can refer to
 any uncultivated species in the genus Allium, especially:
Allium bisceptrum
 Allium canadense
 Allium tricoccum
 Allium validum
 Allium vineale
 Asphodelus tenuifolius
 Cyperus bulbosus
 Bulbine semibarbata

See also
Wild garlic

Allium